NGC 4551 is an elliptical galaxy located about 70 million light-years away in the constellation Virgo. It was discovered by astronomer William Herschel on April 17, 1784. NGC 4551 appears to lie close to the lenticular galaxy NGC 4550. However, both galaxies show no sign of interaction and have different red shifts. Both galaxies are also members of the Virgo Cluster.

See also
 List of NGC objects (4001–5000)
 Dwarf elliptical galaxy

References

External links
 

Virgo (constellation)
Elliptical galaxies
4551
41963
7759
Astronomical objects discovered in 1784
Virgo Cluster
Discoveries by William Herschel